Katsuhiro Oki (born 25 December 1963) is a Japanese taekwondo practitioner. He competed in the men's featherweight at the 1988 Summer Olympics.

References

External links
 
 

1963 births
Living people
Place of birth unknown
Japanese male taekwondo practitioners
Olympic taekwondo practitioners of Japan
Taekwondo practitioners at the 1988 Summer Olympics
Asian Games medalists in taekwondo
Taekwondo practitioners at the 1986 Asian Games
Medalists at the 1986 Asian Games
Asian Games bronze medalists for Japan
20th-century Japanese people